Zapalinamé was the leader of the Huachichil tribe that along with other leaders such as Maquisaco, Maquemachichihuac and Cilavan fought against the Spaniard invasion in the 16th century in what now is the metropolitan area of Saltillo, Mexico.

See also
 Serranía de Zapalinamé

Mesoamerican people
16th-century indigenous people of the Americas